The Preto River is a river of Espírito Santo state in eastern Brazil.
The river flows through the Rio Preto National Forest. It is a tributary of the Itaúnas River.

See also
List of rivers of Espírito Santo

References
Brazilian Ministry of Transport

Rivers of Espírito Santo